Natalia Alexandrovna Kuchinskaya (alternative transliteration Natal'ja Alieksandrovna Kutchinskaja), also known as Natasha Kuchinskaya (Russian: Наташа Кучинская) (born 8 March 1949) is a retired Soviet Olympic gymnast. She won four medals at the 1968 Summer Olympics.

Gymnastics career
Kuchinskaya was born on 8 March 1949 in Leningrad and was selected for a gymnastics class while still in kindergarten. She originally aspired to become a ballet dancer, but was convinced to study gymnastics by her parents, who were both involved with the sport. She trained with Vladimir Reyson and later national team coach Larisa Latynina, who was said to consider Kuchinskaya one of her favorite gymnasts.

By 1965, at age 16, Kuchinskaya was the USSR national champion. At the 1966 World Championships, after winning her second Nationals title, the USSR Cup and the World Trials, she established herself as one of the stars of the Soviet team, winning gold medals in three of the four event finals (balance beam, uneven bars and floor exercise), a bronze on vault, and silvers in the all-around and team events. Kuchinskaya continued her winning streak in 1967, when she won the pre-Olympic test event in Mexico City and swept the USSR Nationals, walking away with the all-around title and every single event final gold medal.

At the 1968 Olympics, Kuchinskaya was arguably the most popular member of the Soviet team. She placed third in the all-around, behind Věra Čáslavská and her teammate Zinaida Voronina; she also shared in the team gold medal and won the balance beam title and a bronze on the floor exercise. She was serenaded with a folk song, "Natalie," during her stay in Mexico City.

The Olympics was Kuchinskaya's final competition. At the time, her sudden departure from gymnastics was attributed to a thyroid illness; in an interview in the late 90s Kuchinskaya also revealed that she had lost her motivation for the sport.

Later life
Following her retirement, Kuchinskaya coached in the USSR, Japan and the United States. She has been married since 1980 to optician Alexander Kotliar and currently lives and coaches in the USA, running her own gymnastics club in Illinois. In 1999 she appeared on the "Soviet Sport War" episode of the PBS documentary The Red Files discussing her experiences in gymnastics. In 2006, she was inducted into the International Gymnastics Hall of Fame.

Achievements

Gallery

References

External links

 Natalia Kuchinskaya at the International Gymnastics Hall of Fame
 
 

1949 births
Living people
Gymnasts at the 1968 Summer Olympics
Soviet female artistic gymnasts
Olympic bronze medalists for the Soviet Union
Olympic gold medalists for the Soviet Union
Olympic gymnasts of the Soviet Union
Olympic medalists in gymnastics
World champion gymnasts
Medalists at the World Artistic Gymnastics Championships
Medalists at the 1968 Summer Olympics